Joo Yang-ja is a South Korean politician.

She was appointed as Minister of Health and Welfare in 1998.

References

20th-century South Korean women politicians
20th-century South Korean politicians
Year of birth missing (living people)
Place of birth missing (living people)
Women government ministers of South Korea